Viva (stylised as VIVA) was a British free-to-air music television channel owned by Viacom International Media Networks Europe. The channel launched on 26 October 2009, replacing TMF, and ceased broadcasting on 31 January 2018.

History
The channel was officially launched on 26 October 2009 by Alexandra Burke, with an exclusive live performance of her single "Bad Boys". The first music video to be shown on Viva was Alphabeat's "The Spell" in The Official UK Chart Show Top 20 hosted by Sarah-Jane Crawford. It originally broadcast for 24 hours a day until Noggin was removed from the schedule and its hours were reduced to 6:00am – 9:00am. It was further reduced to 3:00am – 9:00am on 1 August 2011. 

On 19 September 2011 the channel started broadcasting in the 16:9 picture format but the DOG was still set to the 4:3 picture format and appeared stretched; this was later fixed so it appears within the 4:3 safe zone. As with other Viacom channels, most 4:3 content has been stretched to 14:9.

Viva dropped its free-to-view encryption on satellite on 19 March 2013, before launching on the free-to-air platform, Freesat, on 2 April 2013.

On 8 October 2014, following the Viacom takeover of UK broadcaster Channel 5, it was announced that Viva would be removed from Freeview with all of its entertainment content moving to 5*. Its EPG slot was taken over by 5USA (which had moved from Freeview channel 31 for the launch of Spike) on 15 April 2015, with Viva moving to Freeview channel 74 and its broadcast hours changed to 9:00 to 11:00. The channel still broadcasts full-time on all other platforms.

As of 31 July 2015, Viva moved to Freeview channel 58, and was only available to viewers who had devices which are compatible with Freeview HD, Freeview Play, YouView or EE TV in certain areas of the UK. It broadcast from 9:00 until 11:00. It moved once again on Freeview on 2 October 2015 from Channel 58 to 57. Following the establishment of a stream sharing capacity with 5USA +1, Viva extended to broadcast between 5:00am and 6:00pm on digital terrestrial television.

Closure
Viva ceased broadcasting on all platforms at 6:00am on 31 January 2018, with the final music video shown was Spice Girls' "Viva Forever". A day before, it was removed from Freesat, and the network's website was redirected to the MTV charts webpage. From 1 February, DTT's channel 57 began carrying a part-time placeholder broadcast of 5Spike +1. The 5am-6pm hours previously used by Viva were now used to extend 5USA +1 into daytime. Throughout February 2018, the temporary Valentine's Day-focused MTV Love network replaced it on Sky and Virgin Media, before being replaced by now defunct channel MTV OMG from 1 March 2018.

Former programming
As well as music videos, Viva previously showed programmes from other Viacom channels including MTV, Nickelodeon, Comedy Central and Channel 5.

Catfish: The TV Show (2013–15)
Pretty Little Liars (2010–13)
Brooke Knows Best
Celebrity Deathmatch
The City (2009–12)
The Dudesons in America (2011)
The Hills (2009–12)
Jersey Shore (2011–12)
Hogan Knows Best
Fly Girls (2009–10)
Blonde Charity Mafia
True Beauty (2010–11)
New York Goes to Hollywood
Run's House
Daddy's Girls
Suck My Pop
My Super Sweet 16
America's Best Dance Crew
South Park (2009–13)
Punk'd
The Hard Times of RJ Berger
Viva La Bam
Jackass (2009–15)
Scarred
16 & Pregnant
Teen Mom
Teen Mom 2
Teen Mom 3
Two and a Half Men (2009–12)
16 and Pregnant
The Osbournes

A Shot at Love with Tila Tequila
Scream Queens
Bromance
MTV Cribs
Dirty Sanchez (2009–15)
Hulk Hogan's Celebrity Championship Wrestling
Pants Off Dance Off
Community (season 1)
Teen Cribs
The Official UK Chart Show
Slips
The Fresh Prince of Bel Air (2011–14)
Crash Canyon
Daria
Beavis and Butt-head (2013–14)
Whitney
Bellator MMA
My Wife and Kids
That '70s Show
Brickleberry
Scrubs (2013–15)
Two Pints of Lager and a Packet of Crisps (2013–15)
SpongeBob SquarePants (2012–2015)
The Real World
Laguna Beach: The Real Orange County
Are You the One? (2014–15)

Presenters
Sarah Jane Crawford
Kimberley Walsh

Noggin
Noggin was an early morning children's television block from Nick Jr., that was broadcast on Viva from 06:00 - 09:00 daily. The programming block was first shown on TMF and was initially carried over to Viva. As of March 2010 the block has ended. The schedule in October 2009 included;

Go, Diego, Go!
Dora the Explorer
Little Bear
Maggie and the Ferocious Beast
Yo Gabba Gabba!
LazyTown
Thomas And Friends
The Backyardigans
Wonder Pets!

See also
VIVA Media
VIVA Germany
MTV
MTV Rocks
MTV Base
MTV Dance
MTV Hits

References

External links

Music video networks in the United Kingdom
Television channels and stations established in 2009
Television channels and stations disestablished in 2018
VIVA (TV station)